Mills are sometimes used as a charge in heraldry, usually as a sign for agricultural or industrial endeavours.

Examples

See also
 Millrind
 Millwheel

Heraldic charges
Grinding mills